Federation Fellowships are Australian professorial research fellowships that were instigated by the Australian Government as part of its Backing Australia's Ability initiative. They were initially designed to compete with prestigious overseas grants in an attempt to lure back high-profile Australian researchers from foreign institutions. The first round of Fellowships in 2001 were awarded to 15 researchers, 6 of whom were working overseas at the time.

New funding to the scheme ceased in 2008, with existing fellowships continuing as before. It was replaced by the Australian Laureate Fellowships.

2001 Fellowships
There were nn applications, 15 recommendations and 14 acceptances.

2002 Fellowships
There were 87 applications, 11 recommendations and nn acceptances.

2003 Fellowships
There were 97 applications, 24 recommendations and nn acceptances.

Bachor, Bartlett, Bilek, Burrage, Drummond, Ducker, 
Francey, Holmes, Johnson, Kemp, Lu, Luther-Davies, 
Lynch, Maschmeyer, Middelberg, Milburn, Quiggin, Renfree, 
Robinson, Shaw, Simmons, Tester,

2004 Fellowships
There were 143 applications, 25 recommendations and nn acceptances.

2005 Fellowships 
163 proposals and 25 were approved for funding.

2006 Fellowships
Selection Bios

2007 Fellowships
Selection Bios

2008 Fellowships
Selection Bios

References

External links 
 Federation Fellowships at the Australian Research Council

Science and technology in Australia